Anders Wilhelm Axel Wollbeck (born 10 February 1958 in Stockholm) is a Swedish songwriter and producer. He plays the guitar and keyboard. He is part of the songwriting and production duo Vacuum together with Mattias Lindblom.

Career
Wollbeck has worked with a number of artists in his career including Army of Lovers, Alcazar, Midi, Maxi & Efti, Vacuum, Rachel Stevens, Monrose, Tarja Turunen, Cinema Bizarre, Vengaboys and Tata Young. A number of songs co-written by Wollbeck have become international hits. He has also written and produced soundtrack music for the Tatort episode Kalter Engel.

Personal life
Wollbeck is married to Marie Sundström-Wollbeck, who designed most of Army of Lovers sleeves. The couple has two children and resides in Stockholm.

Selected discography
"Crucified", "Obsession" and Ride The Bullet by Army of Lovers. Crucified was recently featured in the multi million selling computer game Just Dance 4. A re-recorded version of the song peaked at number 18 in 2014 in the Billboard Dance/Club Chart.
"Crying at the Discoteque" by Alcazar. Covered by Sophie Ellis-Bextor on the top 10 UK album Songs from the Kitchen Disco
"I Breathe" by Vacuum (Gold sales in Sweden)
"I Walk Alone", "Die Alive", "Into The Sun", "Victim of Ritual" "Innocence", and "Diva" by Tarja Turunen
"Home" by Julie Berthelsen (2xPlatinum sales in Denmark) 
"What You Don’t Know" by Monrose. #6 in Germany.
"Negotiate with Love" by Rachel Stevens.
"Accidental" by Garou. From the album Piece of My Soul, Gold sales in Canada, Poland and Russia.
"Rocket To Uranus" by Vengaboys
 "Gib Mer A Chance" by Baschi. Gold sales in Switzerland.
"Beginning" by Girls' Generation
"Heavensent", "The Other People" and "Get Off" by Cinema Bizarre from the top ten German album Final Attraction
"Love Is The Law" by Tata Young
"Wild Like That" by Jeanette Biedermann
"Your Life" by Till Brönner from the German top ten album At The End Of The Day
"Chu" by f(x) (Platinum sales in South Korea)
"I Only Know How To Love by The Tenors featured on the Billboard number one album "The Canadian Tenors"
"Y3K" by Tohoshinki featured on the number one Japan and Global Album Chart album TIME
"You Set Fire To My Life", "Out Of The Blue", "Karma" and "Love Falls" by Tina Arena. (Platinum Sales in Australia)
"Eventide", "Crime Of Passion", "Diva Time", "I Am The Sea" and "When The Music Dies" by Nad Sylvan. Nominated for the 2017 Progressive Music Awards .
"Spaceship Earth", "Hear Me" and "Nostalgia" by Burningfields
"Sanctified" by Black Shark Club

Board of Directors assignments
 STIM (Swedish Performing Rights Society. From 2015) 
 SKAP (The Swedish Society of Songwriters, Composers and Authors. From 2016) 
 Export Music Sweden (Organization for promoting Swedish music outside of Sweden. From 2016) 
 Extended Licensing Committee of ICE Services Ltd (Joint venture by STIM, GEMA and PRS For Music. From 2016)
 UniSong (Organization for Swedish songwriters and producers. From 2012)

References

External links

Living people
Swedish male singers
Swedish electronic musicians
Swedish songwriters
1958 births